Qarayusifli is a village and municipality in the Barda District of Azerbaijan. It has a population of 1,138.

See also 
2020 Barda missile attacks

References

Populated places in Barda District